The Weiwang 306 is a Microvan produced by Weiwang, a sub-brand of BAIC. Beijing Automotive Industry Corporation, BAIC, launched the Weiwang brand in March 2011 and will focus on minicars and minivans.

Overview
The Weiwang 306 is the first product at the brand launch, and it is a typical Chinese minivan or mianbaoche. The only available engine is a 1.3L inline-four producing 81hp and 102nm of torque.  The max cargo space is 5.01 cubic meter and the price range starts from 32,300 yuan to 40,100 yuan.

Weiwang 307
The Weiwang 307 is an extended version of the regular Weiwang 306.

References

External links

Official website

vans
Microvans
2010s cars
BAIC Group vehicles
Cars of China